Muvattupuzha was a Lok Sabha constituency in Kerala.

Assembly segments
Muvattupuzha Lok Sabha constituency was composed of the following assembly segments:
Kunnathunad
Piravom
Muvattupuzha
Kothamangalam
Kanjirappally
Poonjar
Palai

Members of Parliament
As Meenachil in Thiru-Kochi
1952: P. T. Chacko, Indian National Congress
1953 (by-election): George Thomas Kottukapally, Indian National Congress

As Muvattupuzha
1957: George Thomas Kottukapally, Indian National Congress
1962: Cherian J. Kappan, Indian National Congress
1967: P. P. Esthose, Communist Party of India (Marxist)
1971: C. M. Stephen, Indian National Congress
1977: George J. Matthew, Kerala Congress 
1980: George Joseph Mundackal, Independent
1984: George Joseph Mundackal, Kerala Congress (Joseph)
1989: P. C. Thomas, Kerala Congress (Mani)
1991: P. C. Thomas, Kerala Congress (Mani)
1996: P. C. Thomas, Kerala Congress (Mani)
1998: P. C. Thomas, Kerala Congress (Mani)
1999: P. C. Thomas, Kerala Congress (Mani)
2004: P. C. Thomas, Indian Federal Democratic Party (however the election was reversed by the Supreme Court, it having found P. C. Thomas guilty of violations of the Electoral code.)

Muvattupuzha Lok Sabha constituency is no longer in existence due to changes in constituencies made by election commission. Most parts have been merged to Kottayam, some to Idukki, Pathanamthitta and Chalakudy .

See also
 Muvattupuzha
 List of Constituencies of the Lok Sabha

References

External links
 Election Commission of India: https://web.archive.org/web/20081218010942/http://www.eci.gov.in/StatisticalReports/ElectionStatistics.asp
 Remaining Date for Muvattupuzha Municipality Election 2020

Muvattupuzha
Former Lok Sabha constituencies of Kerala
Former constituencies of the Lok Sabha
2008 disestablishments in India
Constituencies disestablished in 2008